Charlotte Green may refer to:
 Charlotte and Dick Green, enslaved frontier couple of Bent's Fort
 Charlotte Green, British radio broadcaster
 Charlotte Green (BMX rider), British BMX rider
 Charlotte Green (fencer), American fencer
 Charlotte Byron Green (1842–1929), British promoter of women's education
 Charlotte Hilton Green (1889-1992), American writer and naturalist